The Wautubbee Formation is a geologic formation in Mississippi, United States. It preserves fossils dating back to the Paleogene period.

The formation is named after Wautubbee, Mississippi.

See also

 List of fossiliferous stratigraphic units in Mississippi
 Paleontology in Mississippi

References

Paleogene Mississippi
Mississippi placenames of Native American origin